Thorp Grade School is a notable building located in Thorp, Washington, United States.

On July 16, 2009, it was placed on the National Register of Historic Places as a significant example of American rural education.

Built at a cost of $41,000 during the depths of the Great Depression using WPA funds, the building still stands and has been used continuously by Thorp School District No. 400 since its construction. A finely crafted red brick Colonial Revival structure, it was designed by the noted Northwest architect John W. Maloney.

See also
 Thorp High School
 Kittitas County, Washington
 National Register of Historic Places listings in Kittitas County, Washington

External links
 Thorp Mill Town Historical Preservation Society
 Thorp School District No. 400
 Docomomo, John W. Maloney A complete biographical account of the life and career of John W. Maloney.

References

School buildings on the National Register of Historic Places in Washington (state)
Colonial Revival architecture in Washington (state)
Public elementary schools in Washington (state)
John W. Maloney buildings
National Register of Historic Places in Kittitas County, Washington